Fyodor Fyodorovich Trepov ( – 27 March 1938) was a Russian military and government figure, General of the cavalry, governor general of the General Government of Galicia and Bukovina.

He was a son of Fyodor Trepov.

External links
 Fyodor Trepov

1854 births
1938 deaths
Russian emigrants to France
Imperial Russian Army generals
Governors-General of Kiev